The Einstein family is the family of physicist Albert Einstein (1879–1955). Einstein's great-great-great-great-grandfather, Jakob Weil, was his oldest recorded relative, born in the late 17th century, and the family continues to this day. Albert Einstein's great-great-grandfather, Löb Moses Sontheimer (1745–1831), was also the grandfather of the tenor Heinrich Sontheim (1820–1912) of Stuttgart.

Albert's three children were from his relationship with his first wife, Mileva Marić, his daughter Lieserl being born a year before they married. Albert Einstein's second wife was Elsa Einstein, whose mother Fanny Koch was the sister of Albert's mother, and whose father, Rudolf Einstein, was the son of Raphael Einstein, a brother of Albert's paternal grandfather. Albert and Elsa were thus first cousins through their mothers and second cousins through their fathers.

Etymology 

Einstein is either a German habitational surname from various places named with a Middle High German derivative of the verb einsteinen 'to enclose, surround with stone'; or a Jewish (Ashkenazic) adaptation of the German name, or else an ornamental name using the ending -stein 'stone'.

Einstein family table

Pauline Koch (Albert's mother)

Pauline Einstein (née Koch) (8 February 1858 – 20 February 1920) was the mother of the physicist Albert Einstein.  She was born in Cannstatt, Kingdom of Württemberg. She was Jewish and had an older sister, Fanny, and two older brothers, Jacob and Caesar. Her parents were Julius Doerzbacher, who had adopted the family name Koch in 1842, and Jette Bernheimer. They were married in 1847. Pauline's father was from Jebenhausen, now part of the city of Göppingen, and grew up in modest economic circumstances. Later, he lived in Cannstatt and together with his brother Heinrich, made a considerable fortune in the corn trade. They even became "Royal Württemberg Purveyor to the Court". Their mother was from Cannstatt and was a quiet and caring person.

Early life 
At 18 years old, Pauline married the merchant Hermann Einstein who lived in Ulm. They married in Cannstatt on 8 August 1876. After the wedding, the young couple lived in Ulm, where Hermann became joint partner in a bed feathers company. Their son, Albert was born on 14 March 1879. On the initiative of Hermann's brother Jakob the family moved to Munich in the summer of 1880, where the two brothers together founded an electrical engineering company called  Einstein & Cie. The second child of Hermann and Pauline, their daughter Maria (called Maja), was born in Munich on 18 November 1881. Pauline Einstein was a well-educated and quiet woman who had an inclination for the arts. She was a talented and dedicated piano player. She made Albert begin violin lessons at the age of five.

Business problems 

The factory of Hermann and Jakob was moved to Pavia, Italy, in 1894. Hermann, Maria and Pauline moved to Milan in the same year and one year later, moved to Pavia. Albert stayed with relatives in Munich to continue his education there. 
Unfortunately, the business was unsuccessful and the brothers had to abandon their factory in 1896. Though Hermann had lost most of his money, he founded (without his brother) another electrical engineering company in Milan. This time business was better. However, Hermann's health had deteriorated, and he died of heart failure in Milan on 10 October 1902.

After Hermann 

In 1903, Pauline went to live with her sister Fanny and her husband Rudolf Einstein, a first cousin of Hermann, in Hechingen, Württemberg. Fanny's daughter, Elsa was to become the second wife of Albert in 1919.
In 1910, Pauline moved with her sister, Fanny and her family to Berlin. She took on a job as housekeeper in Heilbronn, Kingdom of Württemberg in 1911. She lived with her brother Jacob Koch in Zurich and from 1915 in Heilbronn again.

Death 
During World War I, Pauline fell ill with cancer. In 1918, when visiting her daughter, Maria, and son-in-law, Paul Winteler, in Luzern, Pauline was taken to the sanatorium Rosenau, due to her illness. At the end of 1919, Albert took his terminally-ill mother out of the sanatorium in Luzern and brought her to Haberlandstrasse 5, Berlin, to stay with him and his second wife, Elsa, where she later died that year.

Hermann Einstein (Albert's father)

Hermann Einstein (30 August 1847 – 10 October 1902) was the father of Albert Einstein. He was Ashkenazi Jewish.

Early life 

Hermann Einstein (also known as Hermann Moos) was born in Buchau, Kingdom of Württemberg to Abraham Einstein and Helene Moos (3 July 1814 – 20 August 1887).

He had six siblings:

 Raphael (3 December 1839 – 15 January 1842); male
 Jette (13 January 1844 – 7 January 1905); female
 Heinrich (12 October 1845 – 16 November 1877); male
 August Ignaz (23 December 1849 – 14 April 1911); male
 Jakob (25 November 1850 – 1912); male
 Friederike "Rika" (15 March 1855 – 17 June 1938); female

At the age of 14, Hermann attended the secondary school in the regional capital Stuttgart and was academically successful. He had a strong affection for mathematics, and would have liked to study in this or a related area, but as the financial situation of the family precluded further education, he decided to become a merchant and began an apprenticeship in Stuttgart.

Marriage to Pauline 

Hermann married 18-year-old Pauline Koch in Cannstatt, Kingdom of Württemberg on 8 August 1876. After their wedding, the young couple lived in Ulm, where Hermann became joint partner in the feather bed shop of his cousins, Moses and Hermann Levi. In Ulm, their eldest son Albert was born on 14 March 1879. On the initiative of Hermann's brother Jakob, the family moved to Munich in the summer of 1880. There, the two brothers founded the electrical engineering company Einstein & Cie, with Hermann being the merchant and Jakob the technician. The second child of Hermann and Pauline, their daughter Maria (called Maja), was born in Munich on 18 November 1881.

Work 
The Einsteins' electrical firm manufactured dynamos and electrical meters based on direct current. They were instrumental in bringing electricity to Munich. In 1885, they won the contract that provided DC lights to illuminate the Oktoberfest for the first time.

In 1893 the Einstein brothers lost a bid on a contract for the electrification of Munich to Schukert; Hermann and Jakob's small company lacked the capital to convert their equipment over from the direct current (DC) standard to the more efficient alternating current (AC) standard being used by Schukert. Their fortunes took a downward turn from there. They were forced to sell their Munich factory and, in search of business, the two brothers moved their company to Pavia, Italy in 1894. Hermann, Pauline and Maja moved to Milan in the same year and one year later moved to Pavia. Albert stayed with relatives in Munich to continue his education there, though he spent time in Pavia as well.

Due to poor business, Hermann and Jakob had to abandon their factory in 1896. Though Hermann had lost most of their money, he founded another electrical engineering company in Milan, this time without his brother. He was supported financially by his relative Rudolf Einstein in this venture. Though business was better this time, Hermann was preoccupied with "worries due to the vexatious money".

Death 
Hermann Einstein died of heart failure in Milan in 1902. His grave is in Civico Mausoleo Palanti inside Cimitero Monumentale di Milano. Hermann Einstein was 55 years old when he died.

Maria "Maja" Einstein (Albert's younger sister)

Maria "Maja" Einstein (18 November 1881 – 25 June 1951) and her older brother, Albert, were the two children of Hermann Einstein and Pauline Einstein (née Koch), who had moved from Ulm to Munich in June 1881, when Albert was one. There Hermann and his brother Jakob had founded Einstein & Cie., an electrical engineering company.

She was born 18 November 1881 in Munich. Maja and Albert got along very well all their lives. She was Albert's only friend during his childhood.

She attended elementary school in Munich from 1887 to 1894. She then moved with her parents to Milan, where she attended the German International School; Albert had stayed behind with relatives in Munich to complete his schooling. From 1899 to 1902, she attended a workshop for teachers in Aarau. After she passed her final exams, she studied Romance languages and literature in Berlin, Bern and Paris. In 1909, she graduated from the University of Bern; her dissertation was entitled "Contribution to the Tradition of the Chevalier au Cygne and the Enfances Godefroi".

In the year following her graduation, she married Paul Winteler, but they were to be childless. The young couple moved to Luzern in 1911, where Maja's husband had found a job. In 1922, they moved to Colonnata near Florence in Italy.

After the Italian leader Benito Mussolini introduced anti-Semitic laws in Italy, Albert invited Maja to emigrate to the United States in 1939 and live in his residence in Mercer Street, Princeton, New Jersey. Her husband was denied entry into the United States on health grounds. Maja spent some pleasant years with Albert, until she had a stroke in 1946, and became bedridden. She later developed progressive arteriosclerosis, and died in Princeton on 25 June 1951 four years before her brother.

Lieserl Einstein (Albert's daughter)

Lieserl Einstein (27 January 1902 – September 1903) was the first child of Mileva Marić and Albert Einstein.

According to the correspondence between her parents, Lieserl was born on 27 January 1902, a year before her parents married, in Novi Sad/Újvidék, Austria-Hungary, present-day Serbia, and was cared for by her mother for a short time while Einstein worked in Switzerland before Marić joined him there without the child.

Lieserl's existence was unknown to biographers until 1986, when a batch of letters between Albert and Mileva Marić was discovered by Hans Albert Einstein's daughter Evelyn.

Marić had hoped for a girl, while Einstein would have preferred a boy. In their letters, they called the unborn child "Lieserl", when referring to a girl, or "Hanserl", if a boy. Both "Lieserl" and "Hanserl" were diminutives of the common German names Liese (short for Elizabeth) and Hans.

The first reference to Marić's pregnancy was found in a letter Einstein wrote to her from Winterthur, probably on 28 May 1901 (letter 36), asking twice about "the boy" and "our little son", whereas Marić's first reference was found in her letter of 13 November 1901 (letter 43) from Stein am Rhein, in which she referred to the unborn child as "Lieserl". Einstein goes along with Marić's wish for a daughter, and referred to the unborn child as "Lieserl" as well, but with a sense of humour as in letter 45 of 12 December 1901 "... and be happy about our Lieserl, whom I secretly (so Dollie doesn't notice) prefer to imagine a Hanserl."

The child must have been born shortly before 4 February 1902, when Einstein wrote: "... now you see that it really is a Lieserl, just as you'd wished. Is she healthy and does she cry properly? [...] I love her so much and don't even know her yet!"

The last time "Lieserl" was mentioned in their extant correspondence was in Einstein's letter of 19 September 1903 (letter 54), in which he showed concern that she had scarlet fever. His asking "As what is the child registered?" adding "We must take precautions that problems don't arise for her later" may indicate the intention to give the child up for adoption.

As neither the full name nor the fate of the child are known, several hypotheses about her life and death have been put forward:

Michele Zackheim, in her book on "Lieserl", Einstein's Daughter, states that "Lieserl" had a developmental disability, and that she lived with her mother's family and probably died of scarlet fever in September 1903.
Another possibility, favoured by Robert Schulmann of the Einstein Papers Project, is that "Lieserl" was adopted by Marić's close friend, Helene Savić, and was raised by her and lived under the name "Zorka Savić" until the 1990s. Savić did in fact raise a child by the name of Zorka, who was blind from childhood and died in the 1990s. Before his death in 2012, her grandson Milan N. Popović, upon extensive research of the relationship between Einstein and Marić, rejected the possibility that it was "Lieserl", and also favoured the hypothesis that the child died in September 1903.

A letter widely circulated on the Internet on the "universal force" of love, attributed as "a letter from Albert Einstein to his daughter", is a hoax.

Hans Albert Einstein (Albert's first son)

Hans Albert Einstein (May 14, 1904 – July 26, 1973) was born in Bern, Switzerland, the second child and first son of Albert Einstein and Mileva Marić. Hans earned his doctorate at ETH Zurich in 1936 and emigrated to the U.S. in 1938. He was a long-time professor of Hydraulic engineering at the University of California, Berkeley, widely recognized for his research on sediment transport.

Eduard "Tete" Einstein (Albert's second son)

Eduard Einstein (28 July 1910 – 25 October 1965) was born in Zürich, Switzerland, the second son of physicist Albert Einstein from his first wife Mileva Marić. Albert Einstein and his family moved to Berlin in 1914. Shortly thereafter the parents separated, and Marić returned to Zürich, taking Eduard and his older brother Hans Albert with her. His father remarried in 1919 and in 1933 emigrated to the United States under the threat of Germany's rising Nazi regime.

Eduard was a good student and had musical talent. After gymnasium, he started to study medicine to become a psychiatrist, but by the age of twenty one he was diagnosed with schizophrenia. He was institutionalized two years later for the first of several times. Biographers of his father have speculated that the drugs and "cures" of the time damaged rather than aided the young Einstein. His brother Hans Albert Einstein believed that his memory and cognitive abilities had been deeply affected by electroconvulsive therapy treatments Eduard received while institutionalized.

After a breakdown, Eduard had told his father Albert that he hated him, and after the father's emigration to the United States they never saw each other again. The father and son, whom the father fondly referred to as "Tete" (for petit), corresponded regularly before and after Eduard became ill. Their correspondence continued after the father's immigration to the U.S.

Eduard remained interested in music and art, wrote poetry, and was a Sigmund Freud enthusiast. He hung a picture of Freud on his bedroom wall.

His mother cared for him until she died in 1948. From then on Eduard lived most of the time at the psychiatric clinic Burghölzli in Zurich, where he died in 1965 of a stroke at age 55. He is buried at Hönggerberg Cemetery in Zurich.

Abraham Einstein (Albert's grandfather)

Abraham Einstein (16 April 1808 – 21 September 1868), the son of Ruppert Einstein and Rebekha Overnauer, is the father of Hermann Einstein and grandfather of Hermann's son, Albert. Abraham married Helene Moos, also a German Jew, in April 1839 in Bad Buchau.  Together, they had several children:

Raphael (3 December 1839 – 15 January 1842), male
Jette (13 January 1844 – 7 January 1905), female
Heinrich (12 October 1845 – 16 November 1877), male
Hermann (30 August 1847 – 10 October 1902), male
August Ignaz (23 December 1849 – 14 April 1911), male
Jacob (25 November 1850 – 1912), male
Regine Friederikeh "Rikah" (15 March 1855 – 17 June 1938), female

Surnames are Einstein and places are in Germany unless otherwise noted.

Einsteins and Ainsteins
First known is Moses Ainstein. He had two sons: Leopold (born  1700); and Baruch Moses E/Ainstein (1665 in Wangen – 1750).

Baruch was married to Borichle (born 1635)  and had three sons: Moyses (1689 in Bad Buchau – 1732); Daniel (born 1690 in Fellheim), and Abraham. He may have been married again.

Moyses was married twice.  His first marriage produced a son, Abraham Einstein (born  1704 in Bad Buchau), a daughter, and possibly another son, David Veit Einstein (1713 in Buchau, Prince-Bishopric of Augsburg – 1763). His second marriage was to Judith Haymann. David was either Judith's son or that of Moyses' first wife.  Judith also had two biological sons: Daniel (1690 in Fellheim, Duchy of Bavaria – after 1720) and Leopold (1700 – after 1719).

Daniel's children
Daniel had four wives, but despite this he had only one child, either a son or stepson: 
Leopold (1720 in Ulm, Holy Roman Empire – 6 November 1796 in Laupheim, Prince-Bishopric of Augsburg) 
Descendent families: Einsteins, Bernheins, Bukas, Steiners, Nathans, Noerdlingers, Strausses, Saengers

Leopold's children
Leopold had one wife called Karoline (born 1700 in Buchau, Germany) and had: 
Abraham (12 January 1718 in Buchau, Prince-Bishopric of Augsburg – 16 June 1787) 
Descendent families: Guggenheims and Einsteins

Abraham's children 
Abraham had one unknown wife and a son: 
Joseph (1726 in Sontheim, Holy Roman Empire – 29 April 1795 in Jebenhausen, Duchy of Württemberg)
Descendent families: Lindauer, Rohrbacher, Weils, Einsteins, Lindauers, Kohns, Levis, Fellheimers, Franks, Lindauers, Heumanns Sulzbergs, Katzs and Wormsers

David's children
From marriage with Karoline Ehrlich he had: 
Moyses 
Naphatali (1733 in Buchau, Prince-Bishopric of Augsburg – 1799) (Einstein's great-great-grandfather), his is grandfather of Abraham above, who had been the Spouse of Greta.

Rupert Einstein (Albert's 1st great-grandfather)

Birthdate: July 21, 1759

Birthplace: Buchau, Biberach, Prince-Bishopric of Augsburg, Holy Roman Empire

Death: Died April 4, 1834, in Buchau, Biberach, Kingdom of Württemberg

Immediate Family:

Son of Naphtali  Einstein and Helene Handle Steppach; Husband of Rebecca Obernauer; Father of Judith Einstein, Raphael Einstein, Abraham Einstein, Samuel Einstein, David Einstein and others; Brother of Judith Jetle Einstein, Joseph Einstein, Daniel Einstein, Veit Hirsch Einstein and Helene Rieser

Naphtali  Einstein (Albert's 2nd great-grandfather)

Also Known As: "Nepthali ben David"

Birthdate: 1733

Birthplace: Bad Buchau, Biberach, Prince-Bishopric of Augsburg, Holy Roman Empire

Death: Died 1799

Immediate Family:

Son of David Veit Einstein and Caroline Einstein; Husband of Helene Handle Steppach; Father of Judith Jetle Einstein, Joseph Einstein, Daniel Einstein, Rupert Einstein, Veit Hirsch Einstein and Helene Einstein; Brother of Moyses (Moses) Einstein

David Veit Einstein (Albert's 3rd great-grandfather)

Birthdate: estimated between 1695 and 1729

Birthplace: Buchau, Biberach, Prince-Bishopric of Augsburg, Holy Roman Empire

Death: Died 1763 in Bad Buchau, Biberach, Prince-Bishopric of Augsburg, Holy Roman Empire

Immediate Family:

Son of Moyses Einstein and Judith Einstein; Husband of Caroline Einstein; Father of Moyses (Moses) Einstein and Naphtali Hirsch Einstein; Brother of Joseph Einstein, Unknown Einstein, Abraham Einstein, Daniel Einstein and Leopold Einstein

Moyses Einstein (Albert's 4th great-grandfather)

Birthdate: 1690

Birthplace: Fellheim, Bavarian Swabia, Electorate of Bavaria, Holy Roman Empire

Death: Died 1732

Immediate Family:

Son of Baruch Moses Ainstein and Borichle Einstein; Husband of Judith Einstein; Father of Joseph Einstein, David Veit Einstein, Abraham Einstein, Daniel Einstein and Leopold Einstein

Baruch Moses Ainstein (Albert's 5th great-grandfather)

Birthdate: estimated between 1615 and 1675

Birthplace: Wangen, Duchy of Württemberg, Holy Roman Empire

Death: Died in Bad Buchau, between 1711 and 1719  Tübingen, Prince-Bishopric of Augsburg, Holy Roman Empire

Immediate Family:

Son of Moses Ainstein; Husband of Borichle Einstein; Father of Moyses Einstein and others

Moses Ainstein (Albert's 6th great-grandfather)

Birthdate: estimated before 1676

Immediate Family:

Father of Baruch Moses Einstein

See also 
 Genius, a television series depicting the Einsteins

References

Works cited
 Einstein, Albert and Marić, Mileva (1992) The Love Letters. Edited by Jürgen Renn & Robert Schulmann. Translated by Shawn Smith. Princeton University Press, Princeton, N.J. 
 
 Christof Rieber: Albert Einstein. Biografie eines Nonkonformisten. Thorbecke: Ostfildern 2018

Further reading 
 Michele Zackheim, Einstein's Daughter: the Search for Lieserl, Riverhead 1999, .

External links 

 Lieserl Einstein's Biography from einstein-website.de
 Pauline Koch's fact file from einstein-website.de

 
Albert Einstein
German families
Jewish families
Jewish-German families
American families of German ancestry
Scientific families